War of the Lance is a strategy game developed by Strategic Simulations, Inc. in 1989, based on the Advanced Dungeons & Dragons Dragonlance campaign setting. The gameplay is based on the War of the Lance in the Dragonlance series.

Gameplay
War of the Lance is presented in a top-down view. In single player mode, the player plays the Whitestone side to fight the evil forces of the Highlord (controlled by the computer). In a two-player game, the second player will play the Highlord forces.

This game is a turn-based strategy game. The player controls various units and heroes of an army against enemy forces. The game can be won in two ways. The player can win by controlling the enemy capitals (the Highlord capital is Neraka, and the Whitestone capitals are the four Knight-countries – Solanthus, Caergoth, Gunthar, and Northern Ergoth), plus the Clerist Tower near Palanthus. If neither side can capture the enemy capitals by the end of the game (Mar/Apr 354 AC), the side with more points (calculated from the size of their forces) wins. Each game-year has five turns.

Plot
The game can be played with two starting-points. The Campaign game starts in the beginning of year 348 AC, with the Highlord controlling Neraka only, and the Whitestone Alliance has not even formed yet. The Whitestone player will need to build it up from scratch.

The Scenario game starts in year 349 AC, with each side having possession of a few countries, and the Whitestone player will start the game in medias res, during the height of the war. In particular, one of the Whitestone countries, elven Silvanesti, will be besieged by a swarm of dragon and enemy troops.

Reception
War of the Lance was unsuccessful for SSI, with approximately 15,255 copies of the game ultimately being sold. The game was reviewed in 1990 in Dragon Magazine #158 by Hartley, Patricia, and Kirk Lesser in "The Role of Computers" column. The reviewers gave the game four out of five stars.

According to GameSpy, War of the Lance is "a proud addition to SSI's legacy," and "is still fun to play today."

Reviews
The Games Machine (May, 1990)
Zzap! (May, 1990)
Micro News (May, 1990)

References

External links

1989 video games
Apple II games
Commodore 64 games
DOS games
Dragonlance video games
Strategic Simulations games
U.S. Gold games
Video games developed in the United States